Joachim Andersen may refer to:

Joachim Andersen (composer) (1847–1909), Danish composer
Joachim Andersen (footballer) (born 1996), Danish footballer